Netter is a surname, and may refer to:

People
 Charles Netter (1826-1882), Zionist leader
 Claude Netter (1924-2007), French Olympic champion foil fencer
 Douglas Netter (1921-2017), American film producer, founder of Netter Digital
 Frank H. Netter (1906-1991), American medical illustrator
 Mildrette Netter (1948-), American sprinter
 Nadine Netter (born 1944), American tennis player
 Thomas Netter (c. 1375-1430), English theologian and controversialist

Settlement
 Kfar Netter, a moshav in central Israel, named after Charles Netter

English-language surnames
Jewish surnames
Lists of people by surname